Transmembrane protein 8A is a protein that in humans is encoded by the TMEM8A gene (16p13.3.). Evolutionarily, TMEM8A orthologs are found in primates and mammals and in a few more distantly related species. TMEM8A contains five transmembrane domains and one EGF-like domain which are all highly conserved in the ortholog space. Although there is no confirmed function of TMEM8A, through analyzing expression and experimental data, it is predicted that TMEM8A is an adhesion protein that plays a role in keeping T-cells in their resting state.

Gene

Locus 

The human gene TMEM8A is found on chromosome 16 at the band 16p13.3.

The span of this gene on chromosome 16 spans from base pair 420,773 to 437,113 making this gene 16,340 base pairs in length. This gene is found on the minus strand of the chromosome. There are no known isoforms.

Aliases 

TMEM8A is also known as Transmembrane protein 8A, Transmembrane Protein 6, Five-Span Transmembrane Protein M83, TMEM6, TMEM8, Transmembrane protein 8 and M83.

Homology

Paralogs 

There are two paralogs for TMEM8A found in humans, C9orf127 and TMEM8C. Both of these paralogs are found on Chromosome 9.

Orthologs 

The ortholog space of TMEM8A is fairly narrow, with the majority of orthologs found in mammals and in particular primates with only a few exceptions.

Protein

Primary sequence 

The gene encodes a protein also called TMEM8A. This protein in 771 amino acids in length but has been shown to have a signal peptide from amino acid 1 to 34; the mature form of the protein is only 737 amino acids in length. The precursor form with signal peptide intact has a molecular weight of 84.780 kilodaltons and the mature form with the signal peptide cleaved has a molecular weight of 81.624 kilodaltons TMEM8A has an isoelectric point of the mature form of pI=7.3.

Domains and motifs 

TMEM8A is a transmembrane protein with five transmembrane domains, making it one of only three proteins found in the human body with five domains; the other two are CD47 and AC133. The protein also contains an EGF-like domain, which is a sequence of about thirty to forty amino-acid residues, found in the sequence of epidermal growth factor (EGF), that has been shown to be present in a more or less conserved form in a large number of other, mostly animal, proteins. The functional significance of EGF domains in what appear to be unrelated proteins is not yet clear. However, a common feature is that these repeats are found in the extracellular domain of membrane-bound proteins or in proteins known to be secreted. The EGF domain includes six cysteine residues which have been shown (in EGF) to be involved in disulphide bonds. The main structure is a two-stranded beta-sheet followed by a loop to a short C-terminal two-stranded sheet. Subdomains between the conserved cysteines vary in length.

Post-translational modifications 

The protein has been shown to undergo glycosolation post-translationally at amino acids 144, 407, and 431. There are also three disulfide bonds between amino acid 498 and 508, 502 and 521, and 523 and 532. These disulfide bonds are all characteristic of proteins with an EGF-like domain.

Secondary Structure

Expression

Expression 

TMEM8A is found to be expressed ubiquitously throughout the human body; however, it has been shown to be downregulated during CD4+ and CD8+ T-cell activation.

Transcript variants 

There are three natural transcript variants of TMEM8A. One is located at amino acid 136 where a threonine is swapped for an alanine. Another is present at amino acid 310 where an isoleucine is swapped for a valine and one at amino acid 567 where an arginine is swapped for a tryptophan. None of these variants result in a change of expression nor any loss/gain of function mutations.

Function

Interacting proteins

Transcription factors 

There are many predicted transcription factor binding sites in the TMEM8A promoter. Below is a table of the best possibilities, which have high confidence values, evolutionary conservation, and/or multiple possible binding sites in the promoter.

Interactions 

TMEM8A has been shown to interact with the following proteins
 ALPL
 NDUFS5
 NME4
 MACF1
 G5
 ENSG00000234651
 ENSG00000237431
 ENSG00000237495

References